The Water Festival is the New Year's celebrations that take place in Southeast Asian nations such as Cambodia, Laos, Myanmar, and Thailand as well as among the Dai people of China. It is called the 'Water Festival' by Westerners because they notice people splashing or pouring water at one another as part of the cleansing ritual to welcome the Songkran New Year. Traditionally people gently sprinkled water on one another as a sign of respect, but as the new year falls during the hottest month in South East Asia, many people end up dousing strangers and passers-by in vehicles in boisterous celebration. The act of pouring water is also a show of blessings and good wishes. It is believed that at this Water Festival, everything old must be thrown away, or it will bring the owner bad luck.

China 
The annual Water Splashing Festival of the Dai ethnic minority falls during the New Year celebrations of the Dai Calendar. It is the most important festival observed by the Dai ethnic people of Xishuangbanna Prefecture, and, similar to its direct neighbour Laos' Songkran  festival, it involves three days of celebrations that include sincere, yet light-hearted religious rituals that invariably end in merrymaking, where everyone ends up getting splashed, sprayed or doused with water.

The festival lasts for three days. The first two days' activities are concentrated on the banks of the Lancang (Mekong) River. On the first day, a grand celebration marks the beginning of the festival.  An outdoor market is set up, where locals go for new year shopping.  It is also a great place to purchase local souvenirs. Local food and snacks are other highlights traveller may not want to miss. Artists create sand carvings in open spaces close to the market.  A dragon boat race is held on the Lancang River to ring out the old year in the afternoon.  At night, the banks of the river are colorfully lit, and locals float river lanterns on the river. Floating river lanterns are an old tradition in China, which is still preserved in many cities today. The practice is thought to drive bad luck away and bring good luck.

On the third day, the climax of the festival is reserved for water splashing. On that day, Dai put on their newest and best clothes, then assemble at the local Buddhist temple, where the monks chant Buddhist scriptures. Afterward, a symbolic water splashing ritual is enacted whereby a Buddhist statue, with pomp and ceremony, is first coaxed out of the temple to the courtyard, then is splashed with water. This important ritual is called 'Bathing the Buddha'.

The completion of the 'Bathing the Buddha' ritual serves as the signal that encourages ordinary mortals to themselves engage in mutual water splashing. Accordingly, people flock to the streets with pots, pans, bottles, or whatever, where they uninhibitedly splash, spray and douse each other with water, with the same gusto with which Westerners engage in a good snowball free-for-all.

The Water Splashing ceremony, however, is more than just good-natured fun; it also contains a religious element: water is regarded by Dai as a symbol, firstly, of religious purity, but also of goodwill among people. Therefore, splashing a fellow human being with water during the Water Splashing Festival, whether a close neighbor or a fellow villager or even a stranger, is an expression of the desire for good luck and prosperity to that person.

In Yunnan (China), the Water Splashing Festival is celebrated by the Dai ethnic group which is one of the 55 ethnic minorities in China. The whole celebration usually starts on the 13th of April and takes 3–7 days. On the first day of the festival Dai people race dragon boats and light fireworks (made of bamboo) for good luck in the coming years. On the second day, Dai people get together to dance, and pour water on others because they believe that pouring water on others can help remove bad luck and bring out happiness. Finally, on the last day of the festival, young generations will get together to exchange gifts and date their mates. The Water Splashing Festival is one of the most influential ethnic festivals in Yunnan area. It attracts thousands of tourists every year from all over China. The huge tourist industry contributes greatly to the development of the area.

Southeast Asia 
The festival has many different names specific to each country, such as Peemai (new year)Songkran in Laos, Songkran or Peemai (new year) in Thai, Chaul Chnam Khmer or Songkran in Cambodia, and Thingyan in Myanmar. The New Year is celebrated in other South Asian countries, based on the astrological event of the sun beginning its northward journey. Traditional dance, singing and cultural shows are performed together during the festival. Religious activities in the tradition of Theravada Buddhism are also carried out at both pagoda and monastery. Young people visit elders to pay respect during this period.

The Myanmar New Year Thingyan is announced by the traditional calendar of Myanmar Team and normally falls around 13 April. Cambodia celebrates the Cambodian New Year from 14 to 16 April (ចូលឆ្នាំខ្មែរ or សង្ក្រាន្ត). The Lao New Year, called Songkran (ສົງກຣານ) in the Lao language, is celebrated every year from 13 to 15 April. The Thai New Year (สงกรานต์ = Songkran in the Thai language) is fixed every year from 13 to 15 April.

"Water Festival" is often a confusing term for foreigners in Cambodia because the Khmer New Year in April is not normally referred to as "the Water Festival", unlike equivalent new year celebrations in neighbouring countries. Rather, the "Water Festival" in Cambodia usually refers to the festival Bon Om Thook (Khmer:ពិធីបុណ្យអុំទូក) focused on traditional boat racing, which usually takes place in November each year.

List of new year

See also
 Bon Om Thouk - Boat Racing Water Festival in Cambodia
 Cambodian New Year
 Puthandu - Tamil New Year
 Holi - Indian festival of color & water
 Lao New Year
 Myanmar New Year
 Śmigus-dyngus - Polish water festival
 Thai New Year
 Vardavar - Armenia water festival
 Water-Sprinkling Festival
 World New Years

References

New Year celebrations
Buddhist holidays
Spring festivals
April observances
Observances on non-Gregorian calendars
Buddhist festivals